Gharm Stadium is a multi-use stadium in Gharm, Tajikistan.  It is currently used mostly for football matches and was renovated after the Tajik Civil War.  The stadium has a capacity of approximately 3,000 people.

Football venues in Tajikistan